Marian Yuliyovych Kropyvnytskyi (born September 8, 1903, in the village of Cherepashyntsi, Russian Empire; died August 16, 1989, in Kyiv, Ukraine) was a Ukrainian artist, painter, and photographer of Polish descent.

Exhibitions

1931 - Ukrainian SSR. The third art exhibition of the Kyiv branch of the All-Ukrainian Association of Proletarian Artists. 
1936 - Moscow. Exhibition of works by a team of Polish-Soviet artists.
1937 - Jubilee Exhibition of works by artists of the Ukrainian SSR. (1917—1937)
1937 - Prosperous Ukraine

References

1903 births
Ukrainian painters
Soviet painters
1989 deaths